Hashibur Reza Kallol is a Bangladeshi film director best known for his 2017 film Swatta, for which he received the Bachsas Award in the category of Best Director.

Career
Kallol started his work life as a photographer at Prothom Alo newspaper.

Kallol wrote and directed the 2011 docu-fiction style film Andho Nirangam, about modern day Bauls and Lalon Shah's philosophy. His second film, the romance Swatta, featuring Shakib Khan and Paoli Dam, took two and a half years to shoot. It was released in 2017. For the film, he received the Bachsas Award in the category of Best Director.

As of 2022, Kallol is also multimedia editor of The Daily Star.

Filmography

 Andho Nirangam (2011)
 Swatta (2017)

Awards 
 2017 Bachsas Award in the category of Best Director for Swatta

References

Bangladeshi film directors
Bangladeshi film producers
Bangladeshi screenwriters
Living people
Year of birth missing (living people)
People from Jessore District